Loaded Mental Cannon is the debut album by the heavy metal band Meldrum. Guest appearances on the album include Brian Robertson (formerly of Thin Lizzy), Marcel Jacob (of Talisman) and founder/guitarist Michelle Meldrum's husband John Norum (of Europe).

Track listing

Personnel

Band members
Michelle Meldrum – guitar
Moa Holmsten - lead vocals
Frida Ståhl - bass
Fredrik Haake - drums

Additional musicians
John Norum - guitar solo on track 4
Brian Robertson - guitar solo on track 9
Marcel Jacob - bass on track 12
Anders Fästader - sitar on track 6
Jesper Skarin - gatam on track 12
Jari Salonen - additional background vocals
Stefan Olsson - percussion
Hasse Sjölander - drums and percussion

References

2001 debut albums
Meldrum albums